The FIFA Club World Cup is an international association football competition organised by the Fédération Internationale de Football Association (FIFA). The championship was first contested as the FIFA Club World Championship in 2000. It was not held between 2001 and 2004 due to a combination of factors, most importantly the collapse of FIFA's marketing partner International Sport and Leisure. Following a change in format which saw the FIFA Club World Championship absorb the Intercontinental Cup, it was relaunched in 2005 and took its current name the season afterwards.

The current format of the tournament involves seven teams competing for the title at venues within the host nation over a period of about two weeks; the winners of that year's edition of the Asian AFC Champions League, African CAF Champions League, North American CONCACAF Champions League, South American Copa Libertadores, Oceanian OFC Champions League and European UEFA Champions League, along with the host nation's national champion, participate in a straight knock-out tournament.

This page details the records and statistics of the FIFA Club World Cup, a collection, organization, analysis, interpretation, and presentation of data pertaining to the tournament. As a general rule, statistics should ideally be added after the end of a FIFA Club World Cup edition.

General performances

By club

By nation

By confederation

Final statistics

 Final success rate
Three clubs have appeared in the final of the FIFA Club World Cup more than once, with a 100% success rate:
 Corinthians (2000, 2012)
 Real Madrid (2014, 2016, 2017, 2018, 2022)
 Bayern Munich (2013, 2020)

Six clubs have appeared in the final once, being victorious on that occasion:
 São Paulo (2005)
 Internacional (2006)
 Milan (2007)
 Manchester United (2008)
 Internazionale (2010)

One club has appeared in the final four times, losing only on one occasion:
 Barcelona (lost in 2006, won in 2009, 2011, and 2015)

Two clubs have appeared in the final twice, won once and lost once:
 Liverpool (lost in 2005, won in 2019)
 Chelsea (lost in 2012, won in 2021)

 Final failure rate
On the opposite end of the scale, sixteen clubs have played one final and lost:
 Vasco da Gama (2000)
 Boca Juniors (2007)
 LDU Quito (2008)
 Estudiantes (2009)
 TP Mazembe (2010)
 Santos (2011)
 Raja Casablanca (2013)
 San Lorenzo (2014)
 River Plate (2015)
 Kashima Antlers (2016)
 Grêmio (2017)
 Al-Ain (2018)
 Flamengo (2019)
 UANL (2020)
 Palmeiras (2021)
 Al-Hilal (2022)

 All-time club final appearances
One club has participated in the FIFA Club World Cup final five times:
 Real Madrid (2014, 2016, 2017, 2018, 2022)

 All-time player final appearances
Toni Kroos has participated in the FIFA Club World Cup final six times and won all of them; he appeared in 2013 as a member of Bayern Munich, and in 2014, 2016, 2017, 2018 and 2022 as a member of Real Madrid.

 All-time manager final appearance record
Rafael Benítez, Pep Guardiola and Carlo Ancelotti have the record number of participations in the FIFA Club World Cup final. Benítez took part in 2005, 2010 and 2012, Guardiola in 2009, 2011 and 2013, and Ancelotti in 2007, 2014 and 2022.

Appearances

List of participating clubs of the FIFA Club World Cup

 Most appearances by a club
Auckland City have the record number of participations in the FIFA Club World Cup, taking part in ten tournaments: 2006, 2009, 2011, 2012, 2013, 2014, 2015, 2016, 2017 and 2022. They were also supposed to participate in the 2020 and 2021 tournaments, but had to withdraw from both because of quarantine due to the COVID-19 pandemic.

 Most consecutive appearances by a club
Auckland City participated in the FIFA Club World Cup seven seasons in a row: 2011, 2012, 2013, 2014, 2015, 2016 and 2017.

 Most appearances by a player
Daniel Koprivcic, Ivan Vicelich, Emiliano Tade, and Toni Kroos have the record number of participations in the FIFA Club World Cup, taking part in six tournaments: 2007, 2008, 2009, 2011, 2012 and 2013 in the case of Koprivcic, 2009, 2011, 2012, 2013, 2014 and 2016 in the case of Vicelich, 2011, 2012, 2013, 2014, 2015 and 2016 in the case of Tade, and 2013, 2014, 2016, 2017, 2018 and 2022 in the case of Kroos.
Emiliano Tade has the record number of consecutive participations in the FIFA Club World Cup, taking part in 2011, 2012, 2013, 2014, 2015 and 2016.
 
 Most appearances by a manager
Ramon Tribulietx has the record number of years as manager in the FIFA Club World Cup, taking part in 2011, 2012, 2013, 2014, 2015, 2016 and 2017.

 Most games played by a club
Al Ahly holds the record for number of matches played in the FIFA Club World Cup, taking part in 22 matches.

 Most games played by a player
Hussein El Shahat has the record number of games played in the FIFA Club World Cup, taking part in 12 matches.

All-time top 10 FIFA Club World Cup table

The following is a list of the top ten clubs with the most points gained in the FIFA Club World Cup. The clubs are primarily ranked by their points gained, on a basis of three points for a win, one for a draw and no points for a loss.

After 2022 FIFA Club World Cup.

Notes

Footnotes

References

External links